The  was a land engagement fought on 24–25 July 1904, during the Imperial Japanese Army's advance toward Liaoyang in first stage of the Russo-Japanese War. The town of Tashihchiao was of strategic importance in the Russo-Japanese War, as it was a railroad junction between the main line on the Russian South Manchurian Railway and a spur which led to the old treaty port of Yingkou (Newchwang). Control of both was essential for further advances by Japanese forces towards Liaoyang and Mukden.

Preparations by the Japanese

On the Japanese side were the 3rd, 4th, 5th and 6th Divisions of the Japanese Second Army under General Oku Yasukata. The combined force had over 64,000 men, including 46,000 infantry, and 252 guns. After the victory at the Battle of Telissu, General Oku rested for four days for re-supply, which was delayed due to heavy rains, and to bring his 6th Division up to full strength. Although the Japanese were moving parallel to the railway line and the Russians had left behind over 300 freight cars at Dalny, the Japanese were unable to utilize the railway due to lack of locomotives. Locomotives procured by the Japanese matching the Russian railway gauge prior to the start of the war had been sunk by Russian commerce raiding in the Sea of Japan. The Japanese improvised by hauling the freight cars by teams of 16 men per car, and in addition hired 70 junks from the Chinese to move supplies up the coast to a point a couple of miles from the Japanese troop deployment.

By 6 July 1904, Oku was ready to move north again, and his four divisions reached the outskirts of Kaiping on 7 July 1904 and through night movements, were into the hills behind Kaiping by the morning of 9 July 1904 and was prepared for either combat or twenty additional days of marching. The following two weeks were spent by both sides with artillery duels and cavalry skirmishes, without major fighting. On 20 July, orders for an attack on 23 July were issued, but again heavy rains delayed the attack, which was postponed by 24 hours.

Oku moved with uncharacteristic caution, as the geography did not favor his usual tactic of flanking maneuvers. Instead, he issued orders for the 3rd, 5th, and 6th Divisions to make a full frontal assault, with the 4th Division left out on far left flank as both a diversion and a reserve.

Preparations by the Russians

The Russian side included the 1st Siberian Army Corps under Lieutenant General Georg von Stackelberg (consisting of surviving forces from the disaster at Telissu, which had retreated north towards Liaoyang, but which had received new orders diverting them to Kaiping, which they occupied on 20 June 1904), and the Fourth Siberian Army Corps under Lieutenant General Nikolai Zarubaev, entrenched behind Kaiping to the north at the town of Tashihchiao. The total strength of the Russian forces was roughly 60,000 men.

General Alexei Kuropatkin had personally overseen the defenses at Tashihchiao. Stakelberg's forces were on the right, with clear field of fire, protected by trenches, mines, barbed wire and redoubts. Isolated hills provided strategically placed observation posts. The defensive position exceeded the Russian defenses at Nanshan, however, the field of view was hampered by fields of kaoliang, which grew to a two-meter height and provided cover for the advancing Japanese. Zarubaiev's forces were on the more vulnerable left flank, which was hilly and full of ravines, and had limited visibility.

Battle

Events of 24 July
The combat began at 05:30 on 24 July 1904, with a long artillery duel. As temperatures soared past , the Russians began to suffer from the effects of the heat, many collapsing from heat stroke due to their thick winter uniforms. A nervous Stakelberg repeatedly asked Zarubaiev about withdrawing; however, Zarubaiev advised that he preferred to withdraw under cover of darkness and not during the middle of an artillery barrage. Japanese infantry began probing attacks by noon.

However, by 15:30, the Japanese had suffered heavy casualties due to unexpectedly strong Russian artillery fire, and had only been successful in dislodging the Russians from some entrenched forward positions. Although outnumbered, the Russian guns had a longer range and higher rate of fire. Both side committed their reserves by 16:00, with combat continuing until 19:30. By the end of the day, the Japanese had only a single regiment remaining in reserve, whereas the Russians still had six battalions. The failure of the Japanese offensive in face of superior Russian artillery boosted the morale of the defenders. However, even as the Japanese were preparing to renew their offensive the following day, the Russian were preparing to retreat.

Events of 25 July
After nightfall on 24 July, Lieutenant General Ueda Arisawa, the commander of the Japanese 5th Division expressed his shame at the performance of his division, and asked General Oku that he be allowed to carry out a night attack. Permission was granted, and after the moon provided enough light at 22:00, the 5th Division moved on the Russian left flank, quickly overrunning the Russian second and third defensive lines. At 03:00, the Japanese 3rd Division also made a night attack, and soon captured key hills which had formed the most important point on the Russian defensive line the previous day. Japanese artillery opened fire at 06:40, but the artillery fire was not returned. The Japanese Sixth Division began moving forward, followed by the Japanese Fourth Division at 08:00 hours.  By 13:00, the Japanese had occupied the remaining Russian positions and the town of Tashihchiao was in Japanese hands. Stakelberg had decided to withdraw immediately as soon as the initial Japanese night attack had begun, and he again conducted a brilliant retreat under fire.

Aftermath
There are wildly varying accounts on the number of casualties at the Battle of Tashihchaio, but historical consensus indicates about a thousand on each side.

Predictably, Viceroy Yevgeni Alekseyev was infuriated by Stakelberg's withdrawal, but Kuropatkin supported his subordinate. General Oku remained at Tashihchaio until 1 August 1904, when he again marched northward with three divisions, while the 5th Division was transferred to the new Japanese 4th Army under General Nozu Michitsura in time to be at the Battle of Hsimucheng.

Order of battle

Japanese
Japanese Second Army, General Oku Yasukata
IJA 3rd Infantry Division, Lieutenant General Ōshima Yoshimasa
IJA 4th Infantry Division, Lieutenant General Ogawa Mataji
IJA 5th Infantry Division, Lieutenant General Ueda Arisawa
IJA 6th Infantry Division, Lieutenant General Ōkubo Haruno
1st Cavalry Brigade, Major General Akiyama Yoshifuru
1st Artillery Brigade, Major General Uchiyama

Total: about 65,000 men, including 46,000 infantry and 252 guns.

Russian
1st Siberian Army Corps, Lieutenant General Georg von Stackelberg
1st East Siberian Rifle Division, Major General Aleksandr Gerngross
1st East Siberian Rifle Brigade Artillery, Major General Luchkarski
9th East Siberian Rifle Division, Major General Kondratovitsh
 Siberian Cossack Division, Major General Kossakowski
4th Siberian Army Corps, Lieutenant General Nikolai Zarubaev
2nd Siberian Rifle Division, Major General Levestam
3rd Siberian Rifle Division, Major General Kossowitsch
1st Siberian Artillery Brigade
Trans-Baikal Cossack Brigade, Major General Pavel Mishchenko

Total: about 60,000 men 105 guns.

Notes

References 
 Connaughton, Richard (2003). Rising Sun and Tumbling Bear. Cassell. 
 
 Journal of the United Service Institution of India, Volume 33, United Service Institution of India

Tashihchiao
Military history of Manchuria
Tashihchiao
1904 in Japan
Tashihchiao
Tashihchiao
July 1904 events